Chip and Pepper Foster are identical twin businessmen from Winnipeg, Manitoba, Canada. They are co-owners of Chip & Pepper California and former hosts of their own NBC series, Chip and Pepper's Cartoon Madness and owners of KUB Bread in Winnipeg, Manitoba.

Chip and Pepper's Cartoon Madness
At a peak in their popularity, the Foster brothers appeared on a Canadian TV station singing "Chip and Pepper: get hip or get out!" The footage came into the hands of NBC's head of entertainment, Brandon Tartikoff, who decided to give them a Saturday morning cartoon show. In fall 1991, Chip and Pepper's Cartoon Madness debuted. The new edition to NBC's animated line-up included sketches and interviews, but old cartoons such as Casper and Captain Caveman took up most of the airtime. The show lasted one season before NBC dropped its animated block altogether in 1992.

Apparel line

Chip & Pepper California is a clothing company which specializes in denim and sportswear that was launched in 1987. In 2003, it entered the premium denim market. It is sold in over 42 countries. The tie-dye fashions were popular in Canada in the late 1980s and early 1990s.

Golf Punk and appearances on the Style Network/E!
In 1994, the Fosters opened a store by the name of Golf Punk. As it grew, they decided to resurrect their signature brand, which took place in fall 2003 in Los Angeles. They made appearances as stylists on the Style Network show The Look For Less and on E!, including Glamour's 50 Biggest Fashion Dos & Don'ts.

C7P
In 2007, the Fosters introduced a brand new line with JC Penney  called C7P. The line was aimed particularly at the teen market, including an array of denim items including jeans, skirts, Bermuda shorts, and crop pants along with T-shirts, tops, and fleece.

Legacy
The 2021 Netflix series Saturday Morning All Star Hits! spoofs the duo as Skip and Treybor, each played by Kyle Mooney.

References

External links
 Chip and Pepper's Cartoon Madness at the Internet Movie Database

Living people
Identical twin male actors
Canadian businesspeople in retailing
Clothing companies established in 1987
Clothing companies established in 2003
Companies based in Los Angeles
Clothing companies of Canada
Clothing companies of the United States
Jeans
NBC original programming
1991 American television series debuts
1992 American television series endings
1964 births
Canadian twins
English-language television shows
Jeans by brand
Television series by DIC Entertainment